Golden Heights was a census-designated place (CDP) in Broward County, Florida, United States. It is now a neighborhood in the City of Fort Lauderdale. The population was 501 at the 2000 census.

Geography
Golden Heights is located at  (26.146363, -80.177617).

According to the United States Census Bureau, the CDP has a total area of 0.1 km2 (0.1 mi2), all land.

Demographics
As of the census of 2000, there were 501 people, 176 households, and 121 families residing in the CDP.  The population density was 3,868.7/km2 (9,832.4/mi2).  There were 185 housing units at an average density of 1,428.6/km2 (3,630.7/mi2).  The racial makeup of the CDP was 1.40% White, 94.01% African American, 1.20% Asian, and 3.39% from two or more races. Hispanic or Latino of any race were 0.40% of the population.

There were 176 households, out of which 19.3% had children under the age of 18 living with them, 30.7% were married couples living together, 29.5% had a female householder with no husband present, and 30.7% were non-families. 24.4% of all households were made up of individuals, and 14.2% had someone living alone who was 65 years of age or older.  The average household size was 2.85 and the average family size was 3.37.

In the CDP, the population was spread out, with 25.3% under the age of 18, 6.0% from 18 to 24, 25.5% from 25 to 44, 20.0% from 45 to 64, and 23.2% who were 65 years of age or older.  The median age was 40 years. For every 100 females, there were 89.1 males.  For every 100 females age 18 and over, there were 78.9 males.

The median income for a household in the CDP was $41,641, and the median income for a family was $34,250. Males had a median income of $28,824 versus $31,111 for females. The per capita income for the CDP was $15,443.  About 10.9% of families and 11.6% of the population were below the poverty line, including 21.6% of those under age 18 and 8.1% of those age 65 or over.

As of 2000, 100% of the population spoke English as a first language.

References

Former census-designated places in Broward County, Florida
Geography of Fort Lauderdale, Florida
Neighborhoods in Fort Lauderdale, Florida
Former census-designated places in Florida